"On the Internet, nobody knows you're a dog" is an adage and Internet meme about Internet anonymity which began as a caption to a cartoon drawn by Peter Steiner, published by The New Yorker on July 5, 1993. The words are those of a large dog sitting on a chair at a desk, with his paw on the keyboard of the computer before him, speaking to a smaller dog sitting on the floor beside him. Steiner had earned between $200,000 and $250,000 by 2013 from its reprinting, by which time it had become the cartoon most reproduced from The New Yorker.

History
Peter Steiner, a cartoonist and contributor to The New Yorker since 1979, has said that although he did have an online account in 1993, he had felt no particular interest in the Internet then. He drew the cartoon only in the manner of a "make-up-a-caption" item, to which he recalled attaching no "profound" meaning, seeing that it had received little attention initially. He later stated that he felt as if he had created the "smiley face" when his cartoon took on a life of its own, and he "can't quite fathom that it's that widely known and recognized".

Context
The cartoon marks a notable moment in the history of the Internet. Once the exclusive domain of government engineers and academics, the Internet was by then becoming a subject of discussion in such general interest magazines as The New Yorker. Lotus Software founder and early Internet activist Mitch Kapor commented in a Time magazine article in 1993 that "the true sign that popular interest has reached critical mass came this summer when the New Yorker printed a cartoon showing two computer-savvy canines".

According to Bob Mankoff, then The New Yorker cartoon editor, "The cartoon resonated with our wariness about the facile façade that could be thrown up by anyone with a rudimentary knowledge of html."

Implications
The cartoon symbolizes the liberation of one's Internet presence from popular prejudices. Sociologist Sherry Turkle elaborates: "You can be whoever you want to be. You can completely redefine yourself if you want. You don't have to worry about the slots other people put you in as much. They don't look at your body and make assumptions. They don't hear your accent and make assumptions. All they see are your words."

The cartoon conveys an understanding of Internet privacy that implies the ability to send and receive messages — or to create and maintain a website — behind a mask of anonymity. Lawrence Lessig suggests that "no one knows" because Internet protocols require no user to confirm their own identity. Although a local access point in, for example, a university may require identity confirmation, it holds such information privately,  without embedding it in external Internet transactions.

A study by Morahan-Martin and Schumacher (2000) on compulsive or troublesome Internet use discusses this phenomenon, suggesting the ability to represent one's self behind the mask of a computer screen may be part of the compulsion to go online. The phrase may be taken "to mean that cyberspace will be liberatory because gender, race, age, looks, or even 'dogness' are potentially absent or alternatively fabricated or exaggerated with unchecked creative license for a multitude of purposes both legal and illegal", an understanding that echoed statements made in 1996 by John Gilmore, a key figure in the history of Usenet. The phrase also indicates the ease of computer cross-dressing: representing oneself as of a different gender; age; race; social, cultural, or economic class, etc. In a similar sense, "the freedom which the dog chooses to avail itself of, is the freedom to 'pass' as part of a privileged group; i.e., human computer users with access to the Internet".

In popular culture

 The cartoon inspired the play Nobody Knows I'm a Dog by Alan David Perkins. The play revolves around six individuals, unable to communicate effectively with people in their lives, who nonetheless find the courage to socialize anonymously on the Internet.
 The Apple Internet suite Cyberdog was named after this cartoon.
 The book Authentication: From Passwords to Public Keys by Richard E. Smith displays Steiner's cartoon on the front cover, with the cartoon's dog replicated on the back cover.
 A cartoon by Kaamran Hafeez published in The New Yorker on February 23, 2015, features a similar pair of dogs watching their owner sitting at a computer, with one asking the other, "Remember when, on the Internet, nobody knew who you were?"
 It has become a frequently used refrain in discussions about the Internet and as such has become an Internet meme, perhaps iconic to Internet culture.

See also

 Dog with a Blog
 "The Canine Mutiny" – an episode of The Simpsons where a credit card is approved for the family dog
 Online identity management

References

Further reading

External links
 Peter Steiner's site
 Myth/Reality
 The Cartoon Bank online
 Nobody Knows I'm a Dog production

1993 works
Adages
Animals on the Internet
Dogs in popular culture
Individual printed cartoons
Internet memes
Internet culture
Works originally published in The New Yorker
1993 neologisms